K-171 was a Project 667B Murena (Delta I by NATO) nuclear ballistic missile submarine of the Soviet Navy. The submarine was launched and commissioned in 1976. The submarine transferred from the Soviet Northern Fleet later that year to the Pacific.

Reactor incident 
On December 28, 1978, while in the Pacific Ocean, K-171 had a reactor failure. Radiation exposure resulted in the deaths of three crew members on board.

Retirement 
Like most Soviet Delta I and Delta II-class submarines that were in service after the Cold War, the submarine was scrapped to comply with new treaties. It was decommissioned from the Russian Navy in 2003.

References

Submarine classes
K-171
K-171
Soviet inventions
Nuclear-powered submarines